Tristemonanthus is a genus of flowering plants belonging to the family Celastraceae.

Its native range is Western and Western Central Tropical Africa.

Species:
 Tristemonanthus mildbraedianus Loes. 
 Tristemonanthus nigrisilvae (N.Hallé) N.Hallé

References

Celastraceae
Celastrales genera